Metamorphosis: Jazz Meets the Symphony #4 is an album by Argentine composer, pianist and conductor Lalo Schifrin with bassist Ray Brown, drummer Jeff Hamilton, trumpeter James Morrison, percussionist Francisco Aguabella and the London Symphony Orchestra recorded in 1998 and released on Schifrin's Aleph label.

Reception
The Allmusic review stated "Lalo Schifrin's fourth attempt to merge symphonic and jazz conceptions takes a turn into dangerous waters, venturing into 20th century classical techniques and some of jazz's most challenging composers... Though one shouldn't use this disc as an entryway into the Jazz Meets the Symphony series, it is the boldest CD of the lot so far, unleashing the full resources of contemporary classical music and welding it firmly onto a jazz chassis".

Track listing
All compositions by Lalo Schifrin except as indicated
 "La Nevada" (Gil Evans) - 6:20 
 "Sanctuary" - 6:17 
 "Tosca Variations" (Giacomo Puccini) - 3:54 
 "Miraculous Monk: Evidence/Epistrophy/Four in One/Criss Cross/Straight, No Chaser/Well, You Needn't/Misterioso/'Round Midnight/Rhythm-A-Ning" (Thelonious Monk) - 13:48 
 "Invisible City" - 5:51 
 "Rhapsody for Bix: Davenport Blues/Royal Garden Blues/Singing the Blues/In a Mist/Rhapsody for Bix Theme/At the Jazz Band Ball/Jazz-Me Blues" (Bix Beiderbecke/Clarence Williams, Spencer Williams/Sam M. Lewis, Joe Young, Con Conrad, J. Russel Robinson/Beiderbecke/Schifrin/Beiderbecke/Tom Delaney) - 23:47

Personnel
Lalo Schifrin - piano, arranger, conductor
James Morrison - flugelhorn, trumpet
Markus Wienstroer - violin, guitar
Ray Brown - bass
Jeff Hamilton drums
Francisco Aguabella - congas
London Symphony Orchestra

References

Lalo Schifrin albums
1998 albums
Albums arranged by Lalo Schifrin
Albums conducted by Lalo Schifrin